The Hussein Bey Mosque (Masjid EL-Bay) is a mosque located in Constantine, Algeria.

History 
Hussein Bey Mosque, was originally named Souk Al-Ghazal Mosque which means the spinning market mosque the name of the mosque goes back to the market that was located in the west, where wool was sold, prepared for weaving. .
The mosque is located between Kerman Street, and Didouche Mourad Street . It is bordered on the north by Shushan Abdel-Baqi Square, on the west by Ahmed Bey Palace, and on the east of Didouche Mourad Street.

It was built during the reign of Hussain Kalyan, known as Abu Kamiya (1713-1736), and it is known today as the Hassan Bey Mosque.
He is Hussein Bey Boukamiya. He is also called Qalyan Hussein. He was born in 1073 AH 1666 AD, with a Turkish origin. 
his reign was quiet. yarn market.
The inscription commemorating the construction of the Souk el-Ghazl Mosque is located in the Ahmed Bey Palace, in the northern wall of the bey kiosk, on a white marble plaque of rectangular shape (1.25 m x 0.62 m) showing the history and founder of the mosque, Hussein Bey ibn Muhammad. French researchers, including Cherbonneau, who He obtained a document from Sheikh Mustafa bin Jalul proving that his grandfather Abbas was the one who built the mosque with his money in the neighbourhood of Souk al-Ghazl. The latter agreed, after Abbas' death, and for fear of the bey forgetting his name and immortalising the name of Abbas, erasing the latter's name and replacing it with his own.

In 1838 During the French invasion It was modified and transformed to a Catholic church under the name Notre-Dame des Sept-Douleurs, meaning The Lady of the Seven Pains,

In 1962 after Independence, it returned to its original nature as a mosque, and is currently known as El Bey Mosque.

Architecture 
The facade of doors and entrances, the mosque according to its current form, its general plan is a rectangular shape, merging in part of its northern and western facade with Ahmed Bey Palace and a ground slope. The mosque has two main entrances on the southern side of it, preceded by stone steps. The mosque has modern and original doors. The first was built to support the original doors as a fence, and the second was made of wood with two shutters, called the iron door with latch, and it was a large size that opened from the inside.
The Mosque of Souk al-Ghazl contains knotted windows overlooking the outside, the upper part of which ends with stucco decoration and is surrounded by a stucco frame on the southern side, 11 windows, and on the eastern and western sides there are 3 arched windows, the dome windows have 3 windows on each side. The southern side, and the other in the northwest corner.
From the outside, the domes of the mosque are circular in shape and are located on both sides of the minaret located on the western side of the mosque. The second type of domes is known as shallow domes, and it is a dome with a cavity less than the central dome in number.
The prayer house: Its shape is rectangular, facing transversely over the mihrab. It is adorned with a half-dome of plaster with floral and geometric motifs. The cavity is covered with brightly coloured ceramic squares. On either side are two black and white marble columns on the right of the mihrab. The pulpit is made of wood, its length and width is 3.45 m. 0.96 m at its front, 0.96 m in height and 2.75 m at its rear. It has 11 degrees, on both sides of it are two feathers adorned with a group of fillings. At the top of the pulpit there is the preacher's session.
There are 30 columns, including those built into the wall, all of them resting on circular bases with cylindrical bodies.

See also

Ahmed Bey Palace
Emir Abdelkader Mosque

References

Mosques completed in 1730
Mosques in Constantine, Algeria
Sunni mosques
Sunni Islam in Algeria
1730 establishments in the Ottoman Empire
1730 establishments in Africa
Landmarks in Algeria
Buildings and structures in Constantine Province
Ottoman Mosques in Algeria
18th-century religious buildings and structures in Algeria